Christian Noël (born 13 March 1945) is a retired French foil fencer, and medalists in four consecutive Olympics, from 1964 to 1976.

References

External links

Sportspeople from Agen
1945 births
Living people
French male foil fencers
Olympic fencers of France
Fencers at the 1964 Summer Olympics
Fencers at the 1968 Summer Olympics
Fencers at the 1972 Summer Olympics
Fencers at the 1976 Summer Olympics
Olympic gold medalists for France
Olympic bronze medalists for France
Olympic medalists in fencing
Medalists at the 1964 Summer Olympics
Medalists at the 1968 Summer Olympics
Medalists at the 1972 Summer Olympics
Medalists at the 1976 Summer Olympics
20th-century French people